The Solicitor General of Sri Lanka is a post subordinate to the Attorney General of Sri Lanka. The Solicitor General of Sri Lanka assists the Attorney General, and is assisted by four Additional Solicitors General. Note that the post was Solicitor General of Ceylon until Sri Lanka became a republic in 1972.

Salary and entitlements
The Attorney General draws a monthly salary and pensionable allowance (as at 2017) of Rs 220,000 and other allowances of Rs 290,800. The attorney general is entitled to an official vehicle. The position is pensionable and holders are entitled for government duty free permits.

List of Solicitors General

See also
 Chief Justice of Sri Lanka
 Attorney General of Sri Lanka

References

External links
 Attorney General's Department